Roshan Atta (Sindhi: روشن عطا) was a popular radio, television and film actress from Pakistan. After her start as a voice actress in Pakistan Radio drama, she became popular on-stage, as a TV and film actress.

Early life 
Atta was born to a doctor's home in the village Sultan Kot, Shikarpur district, in the year 1919. She moved to Saudi Arabia with her family, and after spending some years there, she returned to Hyderabad and resumed her studies there.

Professional career
Her first Sindhi play Moonjharan Jo Maag was aired in 1972. She became a popular figure of both Sindhi and Urdu plays, including:

 Gharbhaati
 Oalra
 Jiyapo
 Bure Hin Bhanbhor Mein
 Jungle

She also acted in Sindhi films, including: 
 Dharti Dil Waran Ji
 Faislo Zamir Jo
 Mamta
 Rat Aeen Ajrak
 Dharti Lal Kunwar
 Ghoonghat Laah Kunwar

Atta also acted in telefilms, including Bainsar Adal Ji and Darya Par. She received a Life Achievement Award from PTV.

Death 
She died at the age of 93, on 30 March 2011 from illness.

References

Pakistani television actresses
1940 births
2011 deaths
Sindhi people
Pakistani film actresses
Pakistani stage actresses
Pakistani radio actresses